Pomisli želju is the seventh studio album by Serbian singer Dragana Mirković and the fifth to feature the band Južni Vetar. It was released in 1990.

This is Dragana's fifth and final album with Južni Vetar. They recorded a total of five albums together, one was released each year beginning in 1986.

Track listing
Mamina i tatina
Niko te, niko, ne zna
Jeleni košute ljube
Cvete moj
Pomisli želju
Ne plače se za junakom
Oprosti što ti smetam
Hoćeš, hoćeš, pogledaćeš
Lažno grliš, lažno ljubiš

References

1990 albums
Dragana Mirković albums